The 1960 SCCA National Sports Car Championship season was the tenth season of the Sports Car Club of America's National Sports Car Championship. It began April 3, 1960, and ended November 13, 1960, after seventeen races.

Schedule

 Feature race

Season results
Feature race overall winners in bold.

 D Modified were classified with C Modified at Marlboro.
 B and C Modified were classified together at VIR; the combined class was won by Dick Thompson's CM Chevrolet Corvette Sing Ray.  The highest-finishing BM car was Bud Gates's Lister-Corvette in 2nd.
 D Modified were classified with C Modified at Lime Rock.
 C Modified were classified with B Modified at Thompson.
 E Modified were classified with D Modified at Thompson.
 E and F Modified were classified together at Watkins Glen; the combined class was won by Roger Penske's FM Porsche 718.  The highest-finishing EM car was William Kimberly in Briggs Cunningham's Maserati Tipo 61.

Champions

External links
World Sports Racing Prototypes: SCCA 1960
Racing Sports Cars: SCCA archive
Etceterini: 1960 program covers

1960
1960 in motorsport
1960 in American motorsport